Jin Air Co., Ltd. is a South Korean low-cost airline. As of April 2018 it operates flights to six domestic cities and 26 international destinations. It launched its first long haul route, between Incheon and Honolulu, in December 2015. It has operated cargo services since November 2013. Jin Air is the first widebody LCC operator in Korea.

In 2018, Jin Air is South Korea's second-largest low-cost carrier, carried 3.5 million domestic passengers, and 5.4 million international passengers, and accounted for an 11% share of the domestic market and a 6% share of the international market. Jin's domestic traffic has also been lower over the past three years because it has focused on the international market.

History
Jin Air is headquartered in Deungchon-dong, Gangseo-gu, Seoul. The name "Jin Air" was officially announced on June 15, 2008, at an opening ceremony in Seoul.

Jin Air began operations in July 2008 with routes to regional destinations in South Korea. The inaugural flight was between Seoul's Gimpo International Airport and Jeju International Airport on July 17, 2008, using a Boeing 737-800. In December 2009, Jin Air began its first scheduled international flights to Bangkok.

2017 initial public offering
Jin Air was the third and last company to join the Korea Exchange (KRX) by way of an initial public offering (IPO) in 2017, alongside Studio Dragon and TissueGene.

On October 30, the KRX announced that Jin Air passed the IPO preliminary approval.

Jin Air had its IPO on December 8, 2017.

Boeing 777 groundings
On 20 February 2021, United Airlines Flight 328, operated by a Boeing 777 powered by PW4077-112 engines performing suffered a fan blade failure shortly after takeoff. This was the third such incident with the Boeing 777 in three years and the fifth PW4000 series engine turbine blade failure in service. CAA, FAA, and JCAB grounded all Boeing 777 aircraft following advice from Boeing.

All carriers had complied with the mandatory groundings or done so voluntarily with the exception of Jin Air's four 777-200ER aircraft until the FAA issued a further airworthiness directive 4 days later.

On 12 June 2022, Jin Air returned its first 777 to scheduled service.

Destinations 
As of April 2022, Jin Air flies to the following destinations:

Codeshare agreements
 Jetstar
 Korean Air

Interline agreements
 Delta Air Lines
 Island Air
 Jetstar

Fleet

Current fleet 
, Jin Air operates an all-Boeing fleet consisting of the following aircraft:

Retired Fleet 
Jin Air operated following aircraft:

References

External links 

Jin Air

진에어 블로그 지점 - Naver Blog

Korean Air
Airlines of South Korea
Airlines established in 2008
Companies based in Seoul
South Korean brands
Low-cost carriers
Companies listed on the Korea Exchange
2017 initial public offerings
South Korean companies established in 2008